John Verner Magnusson (10 October 1890 – 13 March 1966) was a Swedish long-distance runner. He competed in the men's 10,000 metres at the 1920 Summer Olympics.

References

External links
 

1890 births
1966 deaths
Athletes (track and field) at the 1920 Summer Olympics
Swedish male long-distance runners
Olympic athletes of Sweden
Athletes from Gothenburg
Olympic cross country runners